Stefano Guberti (born 6 November 1984) is an Italian former professional footballer who played as a midfielder.

Career
Guberti started his career at Sardinian club Alghero of Serie D. He then played for Sassari Torres in Serie C1. On 30 June 2006, he signed for Ascoli who were then in Serie A. He made his Serie A debut against Atalanta on 10 September 2006.

On 2 February 2009, he joined Bari on a short six-month contract. On selecting the number 17 shirt at Bari, Guberti declared that ''"it was the number I had in Serie A with which I scored my first goal against Milan, so I hope it brings good luck."

On 22 June 2009, he joined Roma for free (as his contract with Bari was expired), signing a four-year contract for roughly €800,000 per season, as confirmed by his new club.

He made his official Roma debut on 30 July 2009, against K.A.A. Gent at UEFA Europa League 3rd qualifying round. On 11 January 2010, U.C. Sampdoria loaned the winger from AS Roma until June 2010. Guberti played for Roma in pre-season, but on 6 August 2010, Sampdoria bought him for €1.5 million, in a co-ownership deal. However, after the club relegated, Sampdoria gave up the registration rights of Guberti and Daniele Mannini for a peppercorn fee of €500 each.

On 15 July 2011, Guberti was loaned to Serie B club Torino with option to co-own the player. Guberti also extended the contract with Roma on the same day, to 2014, and increase the gross basic salary to €1.128 million. To form a co-ownership, the player must had a minimum 2-year left in his former contract with the "mother" club.

In summer 2012 he was suspended for three years due to 2011–12 Italian football scandal.

On 4 March 2021, he returned to Siena, now in Serie D. He helped the club to achieve promotion to Serie C for the 2021–22 season.

Career statistics

Honours 
Bari
 Serie B: 2008–09

References

External links
 A.S. Bari Official Player Profile 

1984 births
Living people
People from Sesto San Giovanni
Footballers from Lombardy
Italian footballers
Association football midfielders
Serie A players
Serie B players
Serie C players
Serie D players
Eccellenza players
Pol. Alghero players
S.E.F. Torres 1903 players
Ascoli Calcio 1898 F.C. players
S.S.C. Bari players
A.S. Roma players
U.C. Sampdoria players
Torino F.C. players
A.C. Perugia Calcio players
A.C.N. Siena 1904 players
Sportspeople from the Metropolitan City of Milan